Windy is an unincorporated community in Wirt County, West Virginia, United States.

The community most likely was so named on account of frequent windy conditions at the town site.

References 

Unincorporated communities in West Virginia
Unincorporated communities in Wirt County, West Virginia